After the Zap is a novel by Michael Armstrong published by Popular Library in 1987.

Plot summary
After the Zap is a novel set in Alaska, where mutations in humans occur after an experimental electromagnetic device detonates.

Reception
J. Michael Caparula reviewed After the Zap in Space Gamer/Fantasy Gamer No. 81. Caparula commented that "This is a fun, fast-paced book that I think SG/FG readers will like a lot."

Reviews
Review by Faren Miller (1987) in Locus, #315 April 1987
Review by Joe Sanders (1987) in Fantasy Review, July–August 1987
Review by Edward Bryant (1987) in Rod Serling's The Twilight Zone Magazine, October 1987
Review by Ken Lake (1989) in Paperback Inferno, #80
Kliatt

References

1987 novels